The 1974 Chatham Cup was the 47th annual nationwide knockout football competition in New Zealand.

Early stages of the competition were run in three regions, with the National League teams receiving a bye until the later stages of the competition. In all, 114 teams took part in the competition, at that time a record number. Note: Different sources give different numberings for the rounds of the competition: some start round one with the beginning of the regional qualifications; others start numbering from the first national knock-out stage. The former numbering scheme is used in this article.

A change was made in the way tied matches were decided, with penalty shoot-outs introduced in the event of ties after extra time. Replays were still used for the later rounds, with a replay being needed in one semi-final.

The 1974 final
With the exception of replays, 1974 was the first time that the final had been held in the South Island, at Queen Elizabeth II Park, Christchurch.  The venue had been used earlier in the year for the Commonwealth Games.

The game was played on a heavily sodden pitch, the result of several days of heavy rain, and thousands of gallons of water had to be removed before the surface was usable. Despite the poor conditions, the game was entertaining, and Christchurch ran out the winners with a late Brian Hardman goal adding to an earlier strike from Ian Park.

Results

Third Round

Replay

Fourth Round

* aet. Manawatu won 4–3 on penalties

Fifth Round

* Eastern Suburbs won 8–7 on penalties

Sixth Round

Semi-finals

Replay

Final

References

Rec.Sport.Soccer Statistics Foundation New Zealand 1974 page
UltimateNZSoccer website 1974 Chatham Cup page

Chatham Cup
Chatham Cup
Chatham Cup
September 1974 sports events in New Zealand